The 7th British Independent Film Awards, held on November 30, 2004 at the Hammersmith Palais, London, honoured the best British independent films of 2004.

Awards

Best British Independent Film
Vera Drake
Dead Man's Shoes
My Summer of Love
Shaun of the Dead
Touching the Void

Best Director
Mike Leigh - Vera Drake
Shane Meadows - Dead Man's Shoes
Roger Michell - Enduring Love
Paweł Pawlikowski - My Summer of Love
Kevin Macdonald - Touching the Void

The Douglas Hickox Award
Given to a British director on their debut feature
John Crowley - Intermission
Saul Dibb - Bullet Boy
Peter Webber - Girl with a Pearl Earring
Emily Young - Kiss of Life
Matthew Vaughn - Layer Cake

Best Actor
Phil Davis - Vera Drake
Ian Hart - Blind Flight
Paddy Considine - Dead Man's Shoes
Daniel Craig - Enduring Love
Geoffrey Rush - The Life and Death of Peter Sellers

Best Actress
Imelda Staunton - Vera Drake
Eva Birthistle - Ae Fond Kiss...
Scarlett Johansson - Girl with a Pearl Earring
Anne Reid - The Mother
Natalie Press - My Summer of Love

Best Supporting Actor/Actress
Eddie Marsan - Vera Drake
Gary Stretch - Dead Man's Shoes
Samantha Morton - Enduring Love
Romola Garai - Rory O'Shea Was Here
Paddy Considine - My Summer of Love

Best Screenplay
Edgar Wright and Simon Pegg - Shaun of the Dead
Shane Meadows and Paddy Considine - Dead Man's Shoes
Paul Laverty - Ae Fond Kiss...
Christopher Markus and Stephen McFeely - The Life and Death of Peter Sellers
Mike Leigh - Vera Drake

Most Promising Newcomer
Ashley Walters - Bullet Boy
Toby Kebbell - Dead Man's Shoes
Atta Yaqub - Ae Fond Kiss...
Emily Blunt - My Summer of Love
Nick Frost - Shaun of the Dead

Best Achievement in Production
Vera Drake
Bride and Prejudice
Code 46
Dead Man's Shoes
Girl with a Pearl Earring

Best Technical Achievement
Mike Eley - Touching the Void (for cinematography)
Eduardo Castro and Ralph Wheeler-Holes - Bride and Prejudice (for costumes)
Mark Tildesley - Code 46 (for production design)
Lucas Roche and Chris Wyatt - Dead Man's Shoes (for editing)
Haris Zambarloukos - Enduring Love (for cinematography)

Best British Documentary
Touching the Void
 Aileen: Life and Death of a Serial Killer
Drowned Out
Peace One Day
Trollywood

Best British Short Film
School of Life
6.6.04
Brand Spanking
London Fields Are Blue
Wasp

Best Foreign Film
Oldboy
The Motorcycle Diaries
Fahrenheit 9/11
Pieces of April
Hero

The Raindance Award
The Barn
Blinded
Chicken Tikka Masala

The Richard Harris Award
Bob Hoskins

Special Jury Prize
Norma Heyman

Entertainment Personality Award
J. K. Rowling

British Independent Film Awards
2004 film awards
Independent Film Awards
2004 in London
November 2004 events in the United Kingdom